The 1992 season of the Ukrainian Championship was the 1st season of Ukraine's women's football competitions. The championship was formed out of Soviet football clubs based in Ukraine. The newly formed championship ran from 18 April 1992 to 3 October 1992.

The championship was organized in two tiers with total of 18 teams. The competition was joined by 13 out of 19 Soviet teams from Ukraine that previous season competed in the Soviet championship.

Teams

Higher League team qualification

First League team qualification

Other teams that withdrew

Higher League

League table

Results

Top scorers

First League

League table

References

External links
WFPL.ua
Women's Football.ua

1992
1992 in Ukrainian association football leagues
1992–93 in Ukrainian association football leagues
Ukrainian Women's League
Ukrainian Women's League